Abdullah Oguz (born 17 June 1958 in Istanbul, Turkey) is a Turkish film director and producer.
Oguz studied at Marmara University. From 1990 to 2000 he produced and directed commercials, TV series and music videos, and later, feature films.

Films

Director
 Sıcak (2008)
 Mutluluk (2007)
 Kartallar Yüksek Uçar (2007)
 O Şimdi Mahkum (2005)
 Ah Be İstanbul (2004)
 Asmalı Konak - Hayat (2003)
 Estağfurullah Yokuşu (2003)
 Karaoğlan (2002)
 90-60-90 (2001)
 Top Model (1994)
 Son Söz Sevginin (1993)

Screenwriter
 Asmalı Konak - Hayat (2003)
 Mutluluk (2007)

References

External links

Turkish film directors
Living people
1958 births
Vefa High School alumni
Film people from Istanbul